Mohammad Ashfiya (born 19 May 1995) is an Indonesian beach volleyball player. He competed at the 2014 Summer Youth Olympics in Nanjing, China. In 2017, Ashfiya alongside Ade Candra Rachmawan competed at the 2017 World Championships but did not advance to the knockout stage after lost three matches in the group stage. He and Rachmawan then won a silver medal at the 2018 Asian Games in Palembang, Indonesia.

Achievements

FIVB Beach Volleyball World Tour 

Key

References

External links
 
 

1995 births
Living people
People from Sidoarjo Regency
Sportspeople from East Java
Indonesian beach volleyball players
Beach volleyball players at the 2014 Summer Youth Olympics
Asian Games silver medalists for Indonesia
Asian Games medalists in beach volleyball
Medalists at the 2018 Asian Games
Beach volleyball players at the 2018 Asian Games
Competitors at the 2019 Southeast Asian Games
Southeast Asian Games gold medalists for Indonesia
Southeast Asian Games medalists in volleyball
Competitors at the 2021 Southeast Asian Games
21st-century Indonesian people